"Kassaman", or "Qassaman" ("we pledge", "the oath" or "we swear"), is the national anthem of Algeria. Moufdi Zakaria authored the lyrics, while the music was composed by Egyptian composer Mohamed Fawzi. The song was adopted as the national anthem in 1962, when the country gained independence from France.

History

The French invaded Ottoman Algeria in 1830 and made it an integral part of Metropolitan France within its colonial empire. For the next century, the native population were given very few political rights. Consequently, a nationalist movement began in the 1920s and gained traction after World War II, when a commitment by the government to grant French Algeria autonomy failed to materialize. A prominent member of this movement was Moufdi Zakaria, a Mozabite Berber poet affiliated with the Algerian People's Party (PPA). He was jailed and tortured on several occasions between the 1920s and 1962. It was during one of these experiences, in April 1955, that he penned the words to "Kassaman". Since he did not have access to paper or writing instruments while incarcerated in Barberousse Prison, Zakaria reportedly wrote the lyrics with his own blood on the walls of his jail cell. The musical portion of the anthem was subsequently composed by Mohamed Fawzi, who was asked to undertake this effort after two earlier submissions by other composers – one of which was by  – were rejected.

Both the lyrics and music were officially adopted in 1962; in that same year, the Évian Accords were signed, paving the way for a referendum in which Algerians overwhelmingly voted in favour of independence, which was duly granted. Although "Kassaman" was only intended to be a provisional national anthem, it has endured to this day.

Lyrics
The lyrics of "Kassaman" are reflective of a war song, This is because it promotes nationalistic ideals and principles on the front line, glorifies the actions of the National Liberation Front (FLN), as well as espousing armed uprising and how it is the sole route to attaining independence. It is also noteworthy in that it alludes to another country – France – specifically concerning the violent struggle against them for independence. The song foreshadows how "the day of reckoning" will befall Algeria's former colonial ruler.

Legal protection
Even though "Kassaman" was adopted in 1962, it was not until November 2008 that an amendment to Article 5 of the Constitution of Algeria was made declaring it as "immutable", given its association with the country's revolution. It also confirmed that the national anthem comprises all of the song's verses, thus ending the deliberation over whether it was still appropriate to include the unfavourable reference to France in the present day.

Notes

References

External links

 Streaming Audio, Lyrics and Info (archive link)
 
 The Musical Score, with Text in Arabic and French, on the Presidency's Website
 The People's National Army's Republican Guards Singing the Algerian Anthem

Algerian patriotic songs
Arabic-language songs
National symbols of Algeria
Political party songs
Anthems of Algeria
1955 songs
National anthem compositions in B-flat major